Silberhütte is German for "silver works" and may refer to:

 Silberhütte (Harzgerode), a village in the borough of Harzgerode in the Harz Mountains of Germany
 Silberhütte (Braunlage), a village in the borough of Sankt Andreasberg in the Harz Mountains of Germany
 Langlaufzentrum Silberhütte, a cross-country skiing centre in the Upper Palatine Forest in Germany